Ohtamış Waterfall is a waterfall in Ordu Province, northern Turkey.

Ohtamış Waterfall is located in the Ohtamış village of Ulubey district in Ordu Province.

References

Waterfalls of Turkey
Landforms of Ordu Province
Ulubey District